Robert Roger Richer (born March 5, 1951) is a Canadian former professional ice hockey defenceman.  He was drafted in the fourth round, 47th overall, by the Buffalo Sabres in the 1971 NHL Amateur Draft; he played in the three games in the National Hockey League with Buffalo during the 1972–73 season, going scoreless.

Career statistics

Regular season and playoffs

External links
 

1951 births
Living people
Buffalo Sabres draft picks
Buffalo Sabres players
Canadian ice hockey defencemen
Charlotte Checkers (EHL) players
Cincinnati Swords players
Ice hockey people from Quebec
People from Cowansville
Trois-Rivières Ducs players